Martin Joos (1907–1978) was an American linguist and professor of German. He spent most of his career at the University of Wisconsin–Madison, and also served at the University of Toronto and as a visiting scholar at the University of Alberta, the University of Belgrade, and the University of Edinburgh. During World War II, Joos was a cryptologist for the US Signal Security Agency. The War Department honored him with a Distinguished Service citation in recognition of his work developing communication systems. After the war he returned to the University of Wisconsin, eventually serving as the chairman of the Department of German.

Biography
Martin George Joos was born on May 11, 1907 into a farming family near Fountain City, Wisconsin. He was one out of ten children and it is noted that his filial relations while growing up were very close. He grew up speaking English and German which later influenced his decision to go into linguistics. He graduated with a bachelor's in electrical engineering, and applied this with linguistics while serving with Signal Security Agency of the United States of America doing crypt-analyses. When he went back for his masters, Joos decided to pursue linguistics and got a degree in German. This led to him receiving a position in Canada at the University of Toronto and at University of Wisconsin. Somewhere during this time before WWII, he married Jennie Mae Austin on September 8, 1938, who he was married to for forty years, and they adopted a daughter named Shari. After his service in WWII, Joos went back to the University of Wisconsin and became a German professor and Chairman of the German Department. In the years following, he became a visiting professor at University of Alberta, University of Edinburgh, and University of Belgrade.

The Five Clocks 
Among Joos's books on linguistics is The Five Clocks (1962), which introduced influential discussions of style, register, and style-shifting, noting systematic characteristics in the shifts in speech between high and low formality settings.

The five aspects of register are:
 Frozen
 unchanging utterances
 remain the same with every utterance
 Ex: written songs, poems, or ballads
 Formal
 monologue
 listener does not participate 
 often in formal contexts
 often avoids interpersonal or cultural context
 Consultative
 dialogue
 assumed no prior knowledge
 both speaker and listener actively participate
 semi-formal, consultative context
 Casual
 dialogue
 shared knowledge
 speaker and listener actively participate
 informal context
 Intimate
 intonation and non-verbal communication
 family and close friends
 intimate context

Phonetics and phonology
Acoustic Phonetics was published in 1948 as a supplement to the journal, Language. It was written in times of exploration of phonetics and explored the unknown in phonetics, more specifically the acoustic aspect of phonetics. Martin Joos wrote the monograph to help the world come to a unified phonetic theory and to introduce acoustic information to phonetics.

Joos's 1958 book, Readings in Linguistics Volume 1 collected important papers on the nature of phonetics and phonology produced during the prior decades, since about 1930. This period saw the emergence of two broad understandings of the nature of the phoneme, either as a class of sounds grouped within the language, or as an abstract opposition within the structure of the language. Joos's collection helped clarify the debate at the time by bringing together key works on both sides.

Selected works 
 1951. Middle High German Courtly Reader (with F.R. Whitesell). Madison: University of Wisconsin Press.
 1957. Readings in Linguistics: The Development of Descriptive Linguistics in America since 1925 (editor). Washington: ACLS.
 1962. The Five Clocks. Bloomington: Indiana University Research Center in Anthropology, Folklore, and Linguistics. Reprinted in 1967 by Harcourt, Brace & World. 
 1964. The English Verb: Form and Meanings. Madison: University of Wisconsin Press. 
 1972. Semantic axiom number one. Language 48(2), 257-265.

References 

1907 births
1978 deaths
University of Wisconsin–Madison faculty
University of Wisconsin–Madison Department of German faculty
Professors of German in the United States
Linguists from the United States
Academic staff of the University of Belgrade